The 1916 United States presidential election in Wisconsin was held on November 7, 1916 as part of the 1916 United States presidential election. State voters chose 13 electors to the Electoral College, who voted for president and vice president.

Background
Ever since the decline of the Populist movement, Wisconsin had become almost a one-party state dominated by the Republican Party. The Democratic Party became entirely uncompetitive outside certain German Catholic counties adjoining Lake Michigan as the upper classes, along with the majority of workers who followed them, completely fled from William Jennings Bryan’s agrarian and free silver sympathies. As Democratic strength weakened severely after 1894 – although the state did develop a strong Socialist Party to provide opposition to the GOP – Wisconsin developed the direct Republican primary in 1903 and this ultimately created competition between the “League” under Robert M. La Follette, and the conservative “Regular” faction.

At the turn of the decade, the Democratic Party underwent a brief revival, as it made significant gains upon its small share of state legislative seats and many people in the state saw in New Jersey Governor Woodrow Wilson the possibility of the party returning to the progressive ideals it was felt to have deserted with Bryan fifteen years beforehand. Wilson would carry Wisconsin in 1912 and in fact improve upon Bryan’s share of the vote from 1908.

During his term, however, Wisconsin‘s heavily German-American population turned against Wilson, with the result that in 1914 the Democrats lost ground in the state legislature, and with the outbreak of war in Europe this opposition increased, because the concurrent Irish rebellion was believed to lie in the interests of the Central Powers, and Wilson was viewed as strongly pro-British. The position of President Wilson as strongly pro-British was intensified when he failed to accept clemency for Roger Casement.

Vote
Republican nominee Charles Evans Hughes campaigned in the state during September, but President Wilson did not campaign in the state, although it was viewed as doubtful in September despite strong feelings that German-American opposition would eliminate Wilson’s chance. Near the end of October, a Tennessean polls suggested that Wilson would carry the state due to his anti-war sentiment, but the Los Angeles Times said Hughes would carry the state by a “moderate margin” despite a straw poll in favour of Wilson. The Oshkosh Northwestern on October 26 viewed the state as “doubtful”, but said their polls indicated Hughes would win by around fifteen thousand votes.

As things turned out, Wisconsin would be comfortably, if not overwhelmingly, carried by Republican nominee Hughes, who won the state by 6.59 percentage points. Sign of the collapse of German Catholic Democratic loyalties was seen in Hughes carrying Ozaukee County, which no Republican had ever won before and was Wisconsin’s only county to resist the landslides against both William Jennings Bryan in 1896 and Alton Brooks Parker in 1904. This German Catholic Democratic collapse – broken abruptly by a powerful vote for coreligionist Al Smith in 1928 and for Franklin D. Roosevelt in 1932 – would be a major feature of interwar Wisconsin presidential politics.

Results

Results by county

See also
 United States presidential elections in Wisconsin

References

Wisconsin
1916 Wisconsin elections
1916